Jurek is the surname of:

 Eszter Jurek (born 1936), Hungarian figure skater and coach
 Kazimierz Jurek (born 1964), Polish ice hockey player
 Marek Jurek (born 1960), Polish politician
 Miroslav Jurek (born 1935), Czech long-distance runner
 Richard Jurek, American author, numismatist and business executive
 Scott Jurek (born 1973), American ultramarathoner, author and public speaker